This is the list of cathedrals in Latvia sorted by denomination.

Eastern Orthodox
Cathedrals of the Russian Orthodox:
 Ss. Boris and Gleb Cathedral in Daugavpils
 St Nicholas Naval Cathedral, Karosta in Liepāja
 St Simeon and St Anne's Cathedral, Jelgava
 Nativity of Christ Cathedral in Riga

Lutheran

Lutheran cathedrals in Latvia:
 Riga Cathedral in Riga
 Holy Trinity Cathedral in Liepāja
 Daugavpils Cathedral in Daugavpils

Roman Catholic
Cathedrals of the Roman Catholic Church in Latvia:
 Cathedral of Our Lady in Jelgava
 Cathedral of St. Joseph in Liepāja
 Cathedral of the Sacred Heart of Jesus in Rēzekne
 Cathedral Basilica of St. James in Rīga

See also

List of cathedrals

References

 
Latvia
Cathedrals
Cathedrals